Jenny Maria Karlsson  (born 2 January 1975) is a Swedish badminton player who competed at the 2000 Summer Olympics. Karlsson who played in the women's and mixed doubles event, had won five titles at the Swedish National Championships, and also won the mixed doubles title at the Nordic Championships in 1999.

Achievements

IBF World Grand Prix
The World Badminton Grand Prix sanctioned by International Badminton Federation (IBF) since 1983.

Mixed doubles

IBF International
Women's doubles

Mixed doubles

References

External links
 
 
 

1975 births
Living people
People from Umeå Municipality
Swedish female badminton players
Olympic badminton players of Sweden
Badminton players at the 2000 Summer Olympics
Sportspeople from Västerbotten County
20th-century Swedish women